Maxime Latour (born April 12, 1993) is a professional Canadian football long snapper for the Toronto Argonauts of the Canadian Football League (CFL).

University career
Latour played U Sports football for the Sherbrooke Vert et Or from 2014 to 2017. He played in 28 regular season games in four seasons for the Vert et Or as the team's long snapper.

Professional career

Montreal Alouettes
Latour was eligible for the 2018 CFL Draft, but was not selected in the draft. He was then signed on September 26, 2018, by the Montreal Alouettes as an undrafted free agent to the team's practice roster. He was released on October 31, 2018, just prior to the last game of the regular season, but was re-signed by the Alouettes to a one-year contract on December 12, 2018. Latour spent training camp with the Alouettes in 2019, but was released with the final cuts on June 9, 2019.

Winnipeg Blue Bombers
On September 4, 2019, Latour was signed by the Winnipeg Blue Bombers to a practice roster agreement following an injury to the team's incumbent long snapper, Chad Rempel. Soon after, he made his professional debut on September 7, 2019, in the Banjo Bowl against the Saskatchewan Roughriders. Rempel returned for the next game and Latour was added back to the practice roster. With Rempel injured toward the end of the regular season, Latour was again pressed into action and played in the last two games of the regular season. He then made his post-season debut on November 10, 2021, against the Calgary Stampeders, but suffered a back injury in the game. This coincided with Rempel's return from the injured reserve, so Latour switched places and went to the injured list himself. Two weeks later, the Blue Bombers won the 107th Grey Cup over the Hamilton Tiger-Cats and Latour won the first Grey Cup championship of his career.

Due to the cancellation of the 2020 CFL season, Latour did not play in 2020. His contract expired on February 9, 2021, and he became a free agent.

Ottawa Redblacks
On September 13, 2021, it was announced that Latour had signed with the Ottawa Redblacks. He was then transferred to the team's practice roster and did not play in a game for the team.

Toronto Argonauts
After the Toronto Argonauts' long snapper, Jake Reinhart, suffered a severe injury, Latour was claimed by the team from the Redblacks' practice roster on October 7, 2021. He played in the six remaining regular season games for the team and the East Final.

Ottawa Redblacks (II)
After the Argonauts' season ended with an East Final loss, Latour's playing rights reverted to the Ottawa Redblacks on December 6, 2021. He became a free agent upon the expiry of his contract on February 8, 2022.

Toronto Argonauts (II)
On August 9, 2022, Latour re-signed with the Toronto Argonauts.

Personal life
During the COVID-19 pandemic in 2020, Latour started a farming business in Orford, Quebec with his friend, Nicolas Boulay.

References

External links
Toronto Argonauts bio

1993 births
Living people
Canadian football long snappers
Sherbrooke Vert et Or football players
Montreal Alouettes players
Ottawa Redblacks players
Players of Canadian football from Quebec
Sportspeople from Salaberry-de-Valleyfield
Toronto Argonauts players
Winnipeg Blue Bombers players